Pousadas de Portugal is a chain of luxury, traditional or historical hotels in Portugal. Formerly run by the Portuguese State, they are now run by the Pestana Group, which in September 2003 won a public bid for the sale of 37.6% of parent company Enatur and for a 40-year running concession. It is a member of the Historic Hotels of Europe.

The Pousadas were envisioned and created in the early 1940s by António Ferro, head of the National Propaganda Secretariat and also a poet and playwright, who had the idea of creating hotels that were both rustic and genuinely Portuguese. His first Pousada was built in Elvas, in the Alentejo, which would be the first of what Ferro called "small hotels that look nothing like hotels". This Pousada is no longer active. There are now 44 Pousadas installed in historic buildings.

The Portuguese word pousada means "hostel" or "inn". In Portugal, the use of the word is registered as a trademark and reserved for the use of the Pousadas de Portugal and also of the Pousadas de Juventude (Portuguese state-run youth hostel chain associated to the Hostelling International). A similar small charming, nature or historical hotel in Portugal that is not part of the Pousadas de Portugal chain is classified as estalagem, a word which also means "hostel" or "inn".

History

Origins
 
Created by the Law 31.259 of 1 May 1941, by António Ferro's initiative. The first hotel was inaugurated in 1942, in Elvas, Alentejo, a region that has several historical pousadas. Other Regional Pousadas were inaugurated, always with a small number of rooms and a special attention to the local gastronomy.

In the 1950s, a new designation was added, Historical Pousadas, these hotels were installed in historical monuments and buildings, castles, convents and monasteries. The first Pousada created under this new designation was Pousada do Castelo in Óbidos.

In 1995, the American Society of Travel Agents and the Smithsonian Foundation, awarded the Pousadas de Portugal the annual prize for the institutions around the world with an active part in the protection of cultural and environmental heritage for touristic purposes.

Privatization
In 2003, due to the accumulation of negative results for more than a decade, the Portuguese Government led by Durão Barroso decided to privatize 49% of Enatur's capital, as well as to concede the management of the Pousadas to the winning group.

The winner was the PPG – Pestana Pousadas Group, formed by Pestana Group (59.8%), CGD Group (25%), Oriente Foundation (15%) and two more companies with 0.2% (Viagens Abreu and Portimar). On 1 September 2003, PPG became responsible for the management of the Pousadas hotel chain for a period of 20 years.

The future

In Portugal, PPG intends to continue the expansion of the hotel chain. Two new Pousadas are planned for 2012, the Pousada de Cascais (on the coast near Lisbon) and the Pousada da Serra da Estrela (in the mountainous central part of the country). The Pousada de Cascais is to be situated in the old citadelle in Cascais to a design by the Gonçalo Byrne architects group (also responsible for the Pousadas in Viseu and Faro) and David Sinclair. The Pousada da Serra da Estrela is to be adapted out of the sanatorium for the railway employees by Cottinelli Telmo. Eduardo Souto de Moura, winner of the Pritzker Prize in 2011 is the architect. He was also responsible for the conversion of the Convent of Santa Maria do Bouro into the Pousada de Amares.

Worldwide
In 2005, the first Pousada de Portugal outside of Portugal opened in Brazil, in a historic building and fort built by the Portuguese. Although this is by far the biggest hotel in the chain, in Brazil the term pousada usually refers to a cheaper hotel, more like a bed and breakfast, which may lead to confusion.

Under an internationalization plan, the PPG wants to open Pousadas in all the locations that the Portuguese once ruled: Asia (Goa, Macau and even East Timor), Africa (Cape Verde, Mozambique and even Angola) and new places in Brazil.

Pousadas hotel chain segmentation
The Pousadas are divided in four main groups, according to their architectural specificity, its surroundings or even its concept:
Pousadas Históricas (Historic Pousadas), located in well preserved yet unspoiled national monuments, such as convents, monasteries, castles or fortresses;
Pousadas Históricas Design (Historic Design Pousadas), also in monuments, castles, convents, fortresses and palaces that were vastly renovated, sporting artistic and contemporary decoration and facilities;
Pousadas Natureza (Nature Pousadas), in natural countryside locations;
Pousadas Charme (Charm Pousadas), located in areas of romantic, unique atmosphere.

Historic Pousadas

In historical buildings
Alvito - Pousada de Alvito Historic Hotel
Beja - Pousada de Beja Historic Hotel
Belmonte - Pousada do Convento de Belmonte
Estremoz - Pousada de Estremoz Historic Hotel
Évora - Pousada de Évora Historic Hotel
Guimarães - Pousada de Guimarães - Sta. Marinha Historic Hotel
Mesão Frio - Pousada do Solar da Rede
Óbidos - Pousada de Óbidos Historic Hotel
Ourém - Pousada de Ourém - Fátima Historic Hotel
Palmela - Pousada de Palmela Historic Hotel
Porto (Freixo) - Pousada do Porto Palace Hotel
Queluz / Lisboa - Pousada de Queluz Palace Hotel
Setúbal - Pousada de Setubal Historic Hotel
Tavira - Pousada de Tavira Historic Hotel
Vila Pouca da Beira - Pousada Convento do Desagravo Historic Hotel
Vila Viçosa - Pousada de Vila Viçosa Historic Hotel

Historic Design Pousadas
In historical buildings with modern architectural elements
Alcácer do Sal - Pousada de Alcácer do Sal Historic Hotel
Amares/Gerês - Pousada de Amares Historic Hotel
Angra do Heroísmo/Açores - Pousada de Angra do Heroísmo Historic Hotel
Arraiolos - Pousada de Arraiolos Historic Hotel
Covilhã - Pousada da Serra da Estrela
Crato - Pousada do Crato Historic Hotel
Faro (Estoi) - Pousada de Faro Palace Hotel

Nature Pousadas

In calm and relaxing places, with characteristics for eco-tourism
Caniçada/Gerês - Pousada do Gerês - Caniçada Charming Hotel
Manteigas - Pousada de Manteigas Charming Hotel
Marão - Pousada de São Gonçalo
Ria de Aveiro - Pousada da Ria de Aveiro Charming Hotel
Sagres - Pousada de Sagres Charming Hotel

Charm Pousadas
In typical buildings or places

Alijó - Pousada de Alijó Charming Hotel
Braga - Pousada de Braga Charming Hotel
Bragança - Pousada de Bragança Charming Hotel
Condeixa-a-Nova - Pousada de Condeixa-a-Nova Charming Hotel
Elvas - Pousada de Elvas Charming Hotel (first Pousada of the network)
Guimarães - Pousada de Guimarães - N. Sra. Oliveira Charming Hotel
Horta/Açores - Pousada da Horta Historic Hotel
Marvão - Pousada de Marvão Charming Hotel
Valença do Minho - Pousada de Valença Charming Hotel
Viana do Castelo - Pousada de Viana do Castelo Charming Hotel
Viseu - Pousada de Viseu Charming Spa Hotel

See also
Tourism

References

Bibliography
Pousadas Directory, Ed.Enatur, Lisboa, 2003

External links

Pousadas de Portugal - Youtube Page

Pousadas of Portugal